Liturgy is an American black metal band from Brooklyn, New York. The band features Ravenna Hunt-Hendrix (vocals, guitar), Mario Miron (guitar),  Tia Vincent-Clark (bass) and Leo Didkovsky (drums). The band have described their music as "transcendental black metal," which was especially described in a manifesto written by Hunt-Hendrix; in the process of transforming their style of black metal, they have experimented with other genres including progressive rock, hip hop and electronic music. In the band's early days, Hunt-Hendrix expressed her interest in the work of Swans, Glenn Branca, Rhys Chatham, La Monte Young and Lightning Bolt as influences.

History
Originally the solo project of Ravenna Hunt-Hendrix, the band expanded to a four-piece in 2008, after the release of the 12" Immortal Life, which was followed in 2009 with their debut album Renihilation. The group's second album, Aesthethica, was released in May 2011 by Thrill Jockey, and was ranked as number 26 on Spin's 50 Best Albums of 2011.

In a 2012 interview with Pitchfork Media, Hunt-Hendrix expressed her desire to move away from black metal on future releases in order to avoid "self-imitation," noting that Aesthethicas recognition "turns it into safe territory." She suggested that the next release could include bells or a focus on electronics. In June 2014, the band recorded its third studio album, The Ark Work, which was released in 2015. The album was named the #1 avant garde album of 2015 by Spin and Rolling Stone. Hunt-Hendrix released her debut electronic album, New Introductory Lectures on the System of Transcendental Qabala, under the name Kel Valhaal in 2016, following the same mythologies she had written as Liturgy's songwriter.

Hunt-Hendrix composed, directed, and starred in the video opera “Origin of the Alimonies,” which was screened at National Sawdust in New York City in October 2018. It was shown with a live score performed by Liturgy alongside an eleven-piece chamber ensemble. In November 2019 a live-action version of the opera was staged at REDCAT in Los Angeles. Liturgy performed in collaboration with the Sonic Boom Ensemble, and the opera featured performers Jeremy Toussaint-Baptiste and Kathleen Dycaico, with choreography by Gillian Wash and light design by artist Matthew Schreiber. 

The band's fourth studio album, H.A.Q.Q., was released without any prior notice in November 2019, with a physical release following five months later. The album is tied to an ongoing series of philosophical lectures by Hunt-Hendrix on YouTube, which details the system of concepts portrayed by the diagram on its cover.

In May 2020, Hunt-Hendrix came out as transgender in an Instagram post.

Band members 
Active members
 Ravenna Hunt-Hendrix – vocals, guitar , electronics 
 Mario Miron – guitar 
 Tia Vincent-Clark – bass guitar 
 Leo Didkovsky – drums 

Inactive members
 Greg Fox – drums 
 Tyler Dusenbury – bass guitar 
 Bernard Gann – guitar

Timeline

Discography

Studio albums 
 Renihilation (20 Buck Spin, 2009)
 Aesthethica (Thrill Jockey, 2011)
 The Ark Work (Thrill Jockey, 2015)
 H.A.Q.Q. (2019)
 Origin of the Alimonies (2020)
 93696 (2023)

EPs 
 Immortal Life (Unfun CD release, 2007) - (Infinite Limbs vinyl release, 2008)
 As the Blood of God Bursts the Veins of Time (2022)

Other releases
 split LP with Oval (Thrill Jockey, 2011)
 "Quetzalcoatl" single (Thrill Jockey, 2015)
 "PASAQALIA II" single (2020)
 "Antigone" single feat. Leya (2020)

References

External links 
Transcendental Black Metal theory paper by Hunter Hunt-Hendrix presented at Black Metal Theory Symposium I: Hideous Gnosis

American black metal musical groups
Thrill Jockey artists
Musical groups established in 2008
Heavy metal musical groups from New York (state)
American noise rock music groups
American avant-garde metal musical groups
Musical groups from Brooklyn